George Blay (born 7 August 1980) is a Ghanaian former professional footballer who played as a right-back.

Club career
George Blay was born on 7 August 1980 in Elmina, Ghana and started to play football at Sekondi Hasaacas. He went to play in Belgium for Standard Liège, making his Belgian First Division debut under coach Aad de Mos on 31 August 1997 in a 3–0 away victory against Germinal Ekeren. He spent a total of five seasons at Standard, reaching two Belgian Cup finals under the guidance of coach Tomislav Ivić, however both of them were lost. Blay afterwards went to play for one season at Mechelen and in 2003 he went to play for three seasons at La Louviére. In 2006, Blay was transferred in Romania at Dinamo București, being recommended by his former Standard teammate, Liviu Ciobotariu, making his Liga I debut on 30 July 2006 in a 2–1 away victory against Național București, being used in his first season spent at the club by coach Mircea Rednic in 31 out of 34 rounds as the club won the title, also appearing in 12 matches as the club reached the sixteenths-finals of the 2006–07 UEFA Cup where they were eliminated with 3–1 on aggregate by Benfica. He spent two more seasons with The Red Dogs afterwards going to play at Internațional Curtea de Argeș and Unirea Urziceni, before in 2011 he returned to Belgium and signed with Royal Antwerp in the Belgian Second Division who bought him to replace Bart Van Zundert, retiring at the end of the 2011–12 season. George Blay has a total of 180 Belgian First Division matches in which he scored 3 goals, made 80 appearances in Liga I and played 25 games in which he scored one goal in European competitions (including 3 appearances in the Intertoto Cup).

International career
George Blay played 7 games and scored one goal for Ghana, making his debut under coach Giuseppe Dossena on 8 April 2000 in a 1–0 away victory against Tanzania at the 2002 World Cup qualifiers first round. His following game was a 5–0 home victory against Sierra Leone at the 2002 World Cup qualifiers second round and in his third game played he scored his only goal for the national team in a friendly which ended 1–1 against Algeria. He was selected by coach Fred Osam-Duodu to be part of Ghana's squad from the 2002 African Cup of Nations, playing in all three games from the group stage, as the team qualified to the quarterfinals where he did not play in the 1–0 loss against Nigeria. On 17 May 2002, Blay made his last appearance for Ghana in a friendly which ended with a 2–0 loss against Slovenia. He also played for Ghana's under-20 national team, participating at the 1999 World Youth Championship where he made five appearances, helping the team reach the quarterfinals where they lost at the penalty kicks in front of Spain, who eventually won the competition.

International goals
Scores and results list Ghana's goal tally first. "Score" column indicates the score after each George Blay goal.

Honours
Standard Liège
Belgian Cup runner-up: 1998–99, 1999–00
Dinamo București
Liga I: 2006–07

References

External links

Living people
1980 births
Association football fullbacks
Ghanaian footballers
Ghanaian expatriate footballers
Ghana under-20 international footballers
Ghana international footballers
2002 African Cup of Nations players
Sekondi Hasaacas F.C. players
Standard Liège players
K.V. Mechelen players
R.A.A. Louviéroise players
FC Dinamo București players
FC Internațional Curtea de Argeș players
FC Unirea Urziceni players
Royal Antwerp F.C. players
Ghanaian emigrants to Belgium
Challenger Pro League players
Belgian Pro League players
Liga I players
Expatriate footballers in Romania
Ghanaian expatriate sportspeople in Romania